Proch may refer to:

  means "powder" ((wikt))

Surnames 
 Heinrich Proch (1809-1878), 19th century Austrian composer
 Louise Proch, singer and actress, daughter of Heinrich Proch
 Bolesław Proch (born 1952) (pl)
 Walter Proch (born 1984), an Italian cyclist (de)
 Daniele Proch (born 1996), an Italian soccer player

See also 
 Broch (disambiguation)

Polish-language surnames
German-language surnames